Reuben V. Anderson (born 1943) is an American attorney who served as a justice of the Mississippi Supreme Court from 1985 to 1990.

Early life
Anderson was born in 1943, in Jackson, Mississippi. His father was a bricklayer, and his great-great-grandparents were slaves. He graduated from Tougaloo College in 1965. He received his law degree in 1967, from the University of Mississippi, a mere five years after it admitted its first black student, James Meredith, and four years after it admitted its first black law student.

Career
Anderson first worked as a civil right lawyer, in the firm Anderson, Banks, Nichols & Leventhal, from 1967 to 1977, where he was the assistant counsel for the NAACP Legal Defense and Educational Fund in the Mississippi office. Anderson was appointed to the Jackson Municipal Court, where he served two years. He  then spent four years as a Hinds County Court Judge. Next, for three years, Anderson was a judge on the 7th Circuit Court of Appeals. In 1985 Anderson was appointed to the State Supreme Court, becoming the first black judge on that court. Following his resignation, Anderson was succeeded on the court by Fred L. Banks Jr.

In July 2020, Anderson was appointed to a special commission tasked with presenting a new design for the Flag of Mississippi to voters for their approval. The nine-person commission elected Anderson as its chairman at its first meeting on July 22.

Family
Anderson's wife is the former Phyllis Wright. They have three children, Roslyn V. Anderson, Vincent R Anderson, and Raina Anderson-Minor.

See also
List of first minority male lawyers and judges in Mississippi

References

1943 births
Living people
Politicians from Jackson, Mississippi
Tougaloo College alumni
University of Mississippi School of Law alumni
Justices of the Mississippi Supreme Court
Lawyers from Jackson, Mississippi